The 2011–12 season was the 126th season played by Shrewsbury Town F.C., an association football club based in Shrewsbury, Shropshire, England. Shrewsbury competed in League Two, whilst also participating in the FA Cup, the Football League Cup and the Football League Trophy.

League table

Squad statistics

Appearances and goals

|-
|colspan="14"|Players featured for Shrewsbury but left before the end of the season:

|-
|colspan="14"|Players on loan to Shrewsbury who returned to their parent club:

|}

Top scorers

Disciplinary record

Results

Pre-Season Friendlies

League Two

FA Cup

League Cup

Football League Trophy

Transfers

Awards

References 

2011-12
2011–12 Football League Two by team